Shoals Marine Laboratory (SML) is a seasonal marine field station located on Appledore Island, Maine, in the United States. Appledore Island is the largest of the Isles of Shoals archipelago, a group of rocky islands just offshore of the coastline of Maine and New Hampshire. The laboratory is cooperatively operated and maintained by Cornell University and the University of New Hampshire. Shoals is a residential facility where participants and staff live together in a close-knit learning community. SML's academic program runs from May through August to accommodate off-campus study for undergraduates. Limited access for research can be arranged during the off-season. Access to Appledore Island is provided by Shoals Marine Laboratory vessels operated by laboratory personnel. SML administrative offices are at Cornell University in Ithaca, New York; at the University of New Hampshire in Durham, New Hampshire; and in Portsmouth, New Hampshire.

History

Appledore Island, originally named Hog Island, was visited by Scandinavians sailing from Greenland before the 17th century. Europeans arrived in 1614 to take advantage of the favorable fishing conditions in the Gulf of Maine. The island saw an exodus in 1680 and sustained a small population until 1847. Thomas Laighton and daughter Celia Thaxter helped to revitalize the island through Celia's hospitality, artistry, and garden. The garden has been restored as a tourist attraction today which helps generate revenue for SML. Celia's death in 1894, subdivision of land in 1908, and a major fire at the Appledore Hotel in September 1914 led to the decline of this era in Appledore history. UNH's Marine Zoological Laboratory on Appledore thrived from 1928 to 1940. This was followed by government control of the island during World War II and a period of vandalism into the 1970s.

The current form of the lab was conceived by John M. Kingsbury and John M. Anderson, both professors at Cornell. Having visited the Star Island conference center, they were keen to bring undergraduate university students out to the Isles of Shoals as an alternative to the Woods Hole Oceanographic Institution. The first group of students arrived on Star Island in 1966. Appledore Island, which was mostly uninhabited since World War II, was selected and developed from the late 1960s to early 1970s as the future home of the lab. UNH took interest in the project due to their proximity and previous association with the island. Dominic Gratta of Kittery, Maine, directed his crew, assisted by students and early SML staff, in the refurbishing of old hotel and military era buildings as well as the construction of six new buildings and utility services.

Academics

SML is dedicated to undergraduate education and research in marine science, and has been offering courses since 1966. The laboratory offers a wide variety of summer credit courses for undergraduates and high school students along with programs and workshops for graduate students, teachers, professionals, and the general public. All Shoals programs provide participants with the opportunity to become immersed in the world of marine science under the tutelage of an academic teaching staff from Cornell, UNH, and other leading academic institutions.

An academic day at Shoals consists of laboratory and classroom time, combined with extensive fieldwork. Fieldwork typically includes excursions along Appledore's rocky intertidal zone and seabird nesting colonies, visits to neighboring islands to study harbor seals, terns, and archaeological sites, off-shore cruises, and trips to the Maine/New Hampshire coast to study mud flats, salt marshes, and bogs. Lessons on sustainable living are incorporated into the experience. Credit course offerings range from survey courses like Field Marine Science to more specialized courses like Field Ornithology, Underwater Research, and Ecology of Animal Behavior. Other programs, workshops, and citizen science opportunities include biological illustration, a course about forensic science, and island archaeology.

There are several courses offered during the summer.

Research

The Shoals Marine Laboratory emphasizes its dedication to undergraduate research by offering several Research Internships in Field Science (RIFS). This program is the successor to the Research Experience for Undergraduates (REU) program which was funded by a seven-year National Science Foundation grant. The RIFS program allows undergraduates to perform a full research project - from proposal to research paper and presentation - in the course of a summer. It also provides participants with full room and board.

In addition to the formal research internship, nearly all credit courses at SML require small individual research projects. For example, students enrolled in the Underwater Research course must produce an original research proposal, supported by preliminary data collected and analyzed in the course.

The lab also hosts and works with visiting researchers from across the country, including a migratory bird banding program, the New Hampshire Fish and Game tern restoration project on White Island, gull research, and monitoring of subtidal communities.

In 2016, researchers investigated an intertidal species of fish called a mummichog. The researchers discovered how mummichogs use a tail-flip jump to cross land into new tidepools, and how they prop themselves into an upright position before leaping to receive extra visual cues. It was suggested that this behavior provides insight into how fish made the transition on to land.

Artist-in-Residence program 
Shoals Marine Lab hosts an Artist-in-Residence (AIR) program each summer where five to six artists stay at Shoals for two or three consecutive weeks at a time. While on Appledore, the artists are free to pursue their art, but are also involved in an art program that is integrated into the classes that are on the island at the same time. The artists usually spend one hour per course per week, and will spend time with a maximum of four separate classes per week. The goal of having the artists interact with the students taking classes is to improve observational skills and generate creativity. When participating in the AIR program, the artists are exposed to the happenings of Shoals Marine Lab, which aims to help the artist create a connection with the natural world and help to blur the lines between art and science.

Previous artists-in-residence 
 Barrett McDevitt (2019)
 Molly Aubry (2018)
 Naila Moreira (2018)
 Bill Paarlberg (2018)
 Patricia Savage (2018)
 Ben Shattuck (2018)
 Carol Schwartz (2017, 2018)
 Krisanne Baker (2017)
 Errol Barron (2017)
 Christopher Volpe (2016, 2017)
 Janis Goodman (2016, 2017)
 Alastair Dacey (2016, 2017)
 Laurie Flaherty (2016)
 Tom Glover (2016)
 Wendy Turner (2016)
 Jana Matusz (2015)

Directors

Island utilities and sustainability

Shoals must provide the utilities necessary to support the island population during its operating season independent of mainland services. Since 1974, SML has generated its own electricity, produced its own drinking water, and treated its own wastewater. Recent initiatives in engineered island systems and the educational and operating benefits to living more sustainably on Appledore have guided the development of renewable energy resources and low impact wastewater management.

Wind, sun, and diesel power

SML maintains three diesel generators and two green energy grids to provide electrical power day and night. Green energy grids collect power from the sun with photovoltaic panels and from the wind with a 7.5 kW Bergy wind turbine. Power collected is stored in sealed absorbed glass mat batteries. There are 52 batteries creating a storage capacity of 388 A·h at a nominal 48 V DC. Stored power is inverted to AC electricity for distribution to the island's 14 buildings. Diesel generators provide backup power. Over the past seven years, addition of photovoltaic power generation with battery storage, along with sustainability and energy efficiency efforts, has:
 Reduced electrical grid load by 50%.
 Reduced diesel generator run times by 50%.
 Reduced fuel needs by 75%.

Propane and solar-based hot water
The solar water heating system collects heat energy from the sun and transfers the energy to domestic hot water systems used in its commercial kitchen and residential shower facilities. In 2012, SML's sustainable engineering interns calculated that the system reduced propane consumption for heating water by 42%.

Wastewater
Sewage is treated with three subsurface leach fields and several Clivus Multrum composting toilet installations. Eljen In-Drain technology was used in order to decrease the size of the leach fields. Composting toilet installations have two major advantages for SML:
 The Nepon foam toilets decrease the amount of water needed to flush from 1.6 gallons, as used by the average flush toilet, to 3 oz.
 Solids composted by the units do not have to be hauled away using a septic truck and barge.

Drinking water
Water is obtained from a  well on the north side of the island. This supply can serve the island throughout the season if there is sufficient rainfall during the summer. A reverse osmosis system provides fresh water if well water does not meet demand. Shoals is licensed by the State of Maine to provide potable drinking water to island residents and visitors. Conservation measures reduce the volume of freshwater used to 1/5 of expected consumption.

Communications
Shoals currently uses a 5.8 GHz wireless link which provides an internet connection from a Portsmouth base station to the World War II-era radio tower on the island. Internet access is distributed to the buildings via a fiber, ethernet, and wireless network. Island staff carry VHF radios for inter-island communication and cell phones work well for mainland phone calls. Vonage is used for more formal office phone and fax needs. VHF channel 80A is monitored for boat to island communication.

Research vessels

Both boats are used to transport goods and people to the island and for research/education. The R/V John M. Kingsbury has a winch and a one-ton crane for the deployment of research equipment and for the movement of heavy materials from the mainland to the island.

The lab also operates various smaller vessels, including the  R/V Acipenser,  R/V Storm Petrel, numerous inflatables, a  Boston Whaler (R/V Miss Christine), and two small sailboats.

References

Further reading
Shoals Marine Laboratory: Visitor's Guide to Appledore Island
Appledore Times, Shoals Marine Laboratory, Winter 2004, Vol. 3, No. 1
The Shoals Marine Laboratory (1999), Cornell University

External links
Official website

Marine biological stations
Oceanographic organizations
Cornell University
University of New Hampshire
1966 establishments in Maine